The 34th Armor Regiment is an armored regiment of the United States Army formed in 1941.

History

1st Battalion
The 1st Battalion, 34th Armor was constituted in the Regular Army on 28 August 1941 as Company A, 34th Armor Regiment. The unit was activated shortly thereafter on 1 October 1941 at Fort Knox, Kentucky, as an element of the 5th Armored Division. During World War II, the 1st Battalion, 34th Armor Regiment was relieved from the 5th Armor Division, reorganized and re-designated as the 772nd Tank Battalion before being sent to Europe. Arriving at Le Havre, France in February 1945, it participated in the Rhineland and Central Europe Campaigns. Simultaneously, 2nd Battalion was reformed as the new 34th Armor Regiment, and 3rd Battalion became the 10th Armored Regiment.

In March 1945, 772nd Battalion was attached to the 44th Infantry Division only days before crossing the Rhine River south of Worms, Germany. The Battalion then led the attack of the 44th Infantry Division, which seized the city of Mannheim, an industrial, and transportation center. In April and May 1945, with the war fast approaching an end, the 772nd Tank Battalion moved rapidly across Germany into Austria, again leading the 44th Infantry Division. In Austria, the Battalion's final combat mission was highlighted by the surrender of the 19th German Army.

After the end of World War II, the Battalion was inactivated on 14 November 1945 at Camp Shelby, Mississippi. It was redesignated on 16 January 1947 as Company A, 306th Tank Battalion. Assigned to the Sixth Army, and allotted to the Army Reserves, the Battalion was activated on 25 June 1947 at Seattle, Washington where the unit remained until 1965. In May 1949, Company A was reorganized and redesignated as Company A, 306th Heavy Tank Battalion before being deactivated again on 15 September 1950. The unit was completely disbanded on 20 February 1952.

It was reconstituted and redesignated as Company A, 34th Armor in March 1957, the unit was withdrawn from the Army Reserve and re-allotted to the Regular Army. In April of the same year, the unit was redesignated as Headquarters and Headquarters Company, 1st Medium Tank Battalion, 34th Armor, concurrently assigned to the 4th Infantry Division and reactivated at Fort Lewis, Washington.

It was again reorganized and redesignated on 1 October 1963 as the 1st Battalion, 34th Armor and again inactivated on 14 October 1965 at Fort Lewis, Washington, and relieved from assignment to the 4th Infantry Division.

The 1st Battalion, 34th Armor was reactivated at Fort Riley, Kansas on 1 August 1979 and assigned to the 1st Infantry Division (United States), the "Big Red One." From 1980 to 1990 the Centurion Battalion participated in numerous field-training exercises to include 4 REFORGER trips to Germany, and 4 deployments to the National Training Center in California. In December 1990, the Battalion deployed to Operation Desert Shield in Saudi Arabia. During Operation Desert Storm, the Battalion was the Brigade Assault Force for the breach of Iraqi defenses, and led the 1st Brigade in the night attack against the Tawakalna Division of the Republican Guard, and was the first unit in the Devil Brigade to enter Kuwait.

The Battalion deployed to Kuwait in 2003 in support of Operation Iraqi Freedom as the first unit from 1st Brigade, 1st Infantry Division (Mechanized) to enter that theater of operations. On 7 September 2003, Task Force 1-34th Armor was assigned to the Multi-National Force Iraq and assigned to the Multi-National Division Central. Elements of 1-34th Armor served in Habbaniyah and Ramadi in the Al Anbar province under the 82nd Airborne and 1st Marine Divisions. In Iraq, Task Force 1-34th encountered the beginning of the insurgency in Al Anbar performing full spectrum operations. The task force's missions included tasks such as renovating schools, helping build a local political structure, and simultaneously closing with and destroying the enemy.

1-34th Armor returned from Iraq in 2004. It subsequently participated in a mission readiness exercise at the Joint Readiness Training Center at Fort Polk, LA for a possible redeployment to Iraq. However, in 2006 the mission of the 1st Brigade, 1st Infantry Division changed to one of training units for deployment to Afghanistan and Iraq, as well as providing small security forces (SECFOR) elements.

2nd Battalion
The 2nd Battalion was deployed from Fort Irwin, California to South Vietnam in September 1966.

2-34th Armor is currently assigned to the 1st Armored Brigade Combat Team, 1st Infantry Division (United States) stationed at Fort Riley, Kansas.

Lineage

Constituted 28 August 1941 in the Regular Army as the 34th Armored Regiment and assigned to the 5th Armored Division

Activated 1 October 1941 at Fort Knox, Kentucky

Regiment broken up 20 September 1943 and its elements reorganized and redesignated as follows:

Headquarters and Headquarters Company and 2d Battalion as the 34th Tank Battalion, and remained assigned to the 5th Armored Division
1st Battalion as the 772d Tank Battalion, and relieved from assignment to the 5th Armored Division
3d Battalion as the 10th Tank Battalion, and remained assigned to the 5th Armored Division
Reconnaissance Company as Troop D, 85th Cavalry Reconnaissance Squadron, Mechanized, an element of the 5th Armored Division
Maintenance and Service Companies disbanded

After 20 September 1943 the above units underwent changes as follows:

34th Tank Battalion
34th Tank Battalion inactivated 8 October 1945 at Camp Myles Standish, Massachusetts
Redesignated 18 June 1948 as the 34th Medium Tank Battalion
Activated 6 July 1948 at Camp Chaffee, Arkansas
Inactivated 1 February 1950 at Camp Chaffee, Arkansas
Activated 1 September 1950 at Camp Chaffee, Arkansas
Inactivated 16 March 1956 at Camp Chaffee, Arkansas
Relieved 27 March 1957 from assignment to the 5th Armored Division

772d Tank Battalion
772d Tank Battalion inactivated 14 November 1945 at Camp Shelby, Mississippi
Withdrawn 16 January 1947 from the Regular Army, redesignated as the 306th Tank Battalion, and allotted to the Organized Reserves
Headquarters and Headquarters Company activated 5 February 1947 at Seattle, Washington (remainder of battalion activated 25 June 1947)
(Organized Reserves redesignated 25 March 1948 as the Organized Reserve Corps; redesignated 9 July 1952 as the Army Reserve)
Reorganized and redesignated 2 May 1949 as the 306th Heavy Tank Battalion
Inactivated 15 September 1950 at Seattle, Washington
Disbanded 20 February 1952
Reconstituted 27 March 1957 in the Regular Army as the 306th Heavy Tank Battalion

10th Tank Battalion
10th Tank Battalion inactivated 9 October 1945 at Camp Myles Standish, Massachusetts
Redesignated 18 June 1948 as the 10th Medium Tank Battalion
Activated 6 July 1948 at Camp Chaffee, Arkansas
Inactivated 1 February 1950 at Camp Chaffee, Arkansas
Activated 1 September 1950 at Camp Chaffee, Arkansas
Inactivated 16 March 1956 at Camp Chaffee, Arkansas
Relieved 27 March 1957 from assignment to the 5th Armored Division

Troop D, 85th Cavalry Reconnaissance Squadron, Mechanized
Troop D, 85th Cavalry Reconnaissance Squadron, Mechanized, redesignated 25 August 1945 as Troop D, 85th Mechanized Cavalry Reconnaissance Squadron
Inactivated 11 October 1945 at Camp Kilmer, New Jersey
Redesignated 18 June 1948 as Company D, 85th Reconnaissance Battalion
Activated 6 July 1948 at Camp Chaffee, Arkansas
Inactivated 1 February 1950 at Camp Chaffee, Arkansas
Activated 1 September 1950 at Camp Chaffee, Arkansas
Inactivated 16 March 1956 at Camp Chaffee, Arkansas

Maintenance and Service Companies, 34th Armored Regiment
Maintenance and Service Companies, 34th Armored Regiment, reconstituted 27 March 1957 in the Regular Army

34th and 10th Medium Tank Battalions; 306th Heavy Tank Battalion; Company D, 85th Reconnaissance Battalion; and Maintenance and Service Companies, 34th Armored Regiment, consolidated, reorganized, and redesignated 27 March 1957 as the 34th Armor, a parent regiment under the Combat Arms Regimental System

Withdrawn 16 February 1988 from the Combat Arms Regimental System and reorganized under the United States Army Regimental System

Distinctive Unit Insignia
 Description
A Gold color metal and enamel device 1 5/32 inches (2.94 cm) in height overall consisting of a shield blazoned:  Azure, an arm embowed Proper and couped at the shoulder raised and armed with a buckler Or having seven rivets of the field three and four.
 Symbolism
The buckler represents the armored protective device.  The arm embowed is raised in the attitude of striking.
 Background
The distinctive unit insignia was originally approved for the 34th Armored Regiment (Light) on 10 December 1941.  It was redesignated for the 34th Armored Regiment on 26 March 1942.  The insignia was redesignated for the 34th Tank Battalion on 10 November 1943.  It was redesignated for the 34th Medium Tank Battalion on 29 March 1954.  It was redesignated for the 34th Armor Regiment on 20 January 1958.

Coat of Arms

Blazon
 Shield
Azure, an arm embowed Proper and couped at the shoulder raised and armed with a buckler Or having seven rivets of the field three and four.
 Crest
On a wreath Or and Azure, in front of a tower Gules masoned of the first and emitting from each side a stream of water of the second, three spears one in pale and two in saltire with shafts of the first and points of the second those points in saltire each charged with a fleur-de-lis of the first, over all in pale an escutcheon barry of ten Argent and of the second.
Motto THE STRONG ARM FOR VICTORY.
 Symbolism
 Shield
The buckler represents the armored protective device.  The arm embowed is raised in the attitude of striking.
 Crest
The red tower gushing water to each side alludes to the bitter campaign to secure the dams of the Roer River, for which the Regiment received a Distinguished Unit Citation.  The spears refer to the unit's push through Normandy, Northern France and Germany.  The shield, bearing a part of the arms of Luxembourg, represents the award of the Luxembourg Croix de Guerre for participation in the liberation of that state.
 Background
The coat of arms was originally approved for the 34th Armored Regiment (Light) on 10 December 1941.  It was redesignated for the 34th Armored Regiment on 26 March 1942.  It was redesignated for the 34th Tank Battalion on 10 November 1943.  The insignia was redesignated for the 34th Medium Tank Battalion on 29 March 1954.  It was redesignated for the 34th Armor Regiment on 20 January 1958.  The insignia was amended to add a crest on 9 June 1964.

Campaign participation credit
World War II: Normandy; Northern France; Rhineland; Ardennes-Alsace; Central Europe

Vietnam': Counteroffensive, Phase II; Counteroffensive, Phase III; Tet Counteroffensive; Counteroffensive, Phase IV; Counteroffensive, Phase V; Counteroffensive, Phase VI; Tet 69/Counteroffensive; Summer-Fall 1969; Winter-Spring 1970; Sanctuary Counteroffensive; Counteroffensive, Phase VII

Southwest Asia: Defense of Saudi Arabia; Liberation and Defense of Kuwait; Cease-Fire
Southwest Aisa: Operation Iraq Freedom based out of Forward Operating Base Gabe, Baqubah 2005-2006

Decorations
Presidential Unit Citation (Army), Streamer embroidered ROER RIVER DAMS
Presidential Unit Citation (Army), Streamer embroidered SUOI TRE, VIETNAM
Valorous Unit Award, Streamer embroidered FISH HOOK
Valorous Unit Award, Streamer embroidered IRAQ
Valorous Unit Award, Streamer embroidered IRAQ-KUWAIT
Luxembourg Croix de Guerre, Streamer embroidered LUXEMBOURG

See also
 List of armored and cavalry regiments of the United States Army

References

034
1941 establishments in Kentucky
Military units and formations established in 1941